Tonra is a surname in the English language. The surname is an Anglicised form of the Irish Ó Tomhnra.

People with the surname
Mark Tonra, American, cartoonist
 Elena Tonra, singer-songwriter of Daughter (band)

See also

Tona (name)
Tonda (name)
Tonja (name)
Tonka (name)

References

English-language surnames